_ (no official pronunciation) is the tenth studio album by American electronica musician BT. It was released digitally on October 14, 2016, and the physical USB release was shipped on December 2, 2016. This included more than two hours of music with 4K-resolution videos shot by drone for the album.

The album was intended to be untitled. However, due to the restrictions of digital download services, which forbade blank titles, BT chose to use an underscore as the album's name. He admitted that this title resulted in complaints from fans about difficulties in finding the album on popular services due to the inability of most search engines to handle the character.

Background
On December 14, 2015, BT disclosed news to DJ Mag about a new album to come by early 2016. Similar to This Binary Universe, BT explains that "the entire record is recorded in a way [I have] never recorded anything before," and that the record has a "modular, ambient aesthetic". Track names that were mentioned in the article include "Chromatophore", "Ω", "Indivism" and "582" (the names of "Indivism" and "582" were changed to "Indivisim" and "Five Hundred and Eighty Two" in the final release). On August 1, 2016, BT spoke to Mix about the album, which was recently completed. The album is intended to be named by the listeners. Additional track names that were mentioned in the article include "Artifacture", "Five Hundred and Eighty Two", and "Found in Translation". On October 10, 2016, BT announced on Facebook that the parts of the album ("Artifacture", "Indivism" and "Ω") would be released in "movements" on October 14, 2016.

The album was recorded in Maine, Maryland, Iceland, China, Poland, Bora Bora, Tokyo, Australia and many other places around the world.

Track listing

"Artifacture", "Indivisim" and "Ω" (_)

Charts

Release history

References

External links
_ on Black Hole Recordings

2016 albums
BT (musician) albums
Black Hole Recordings albums
Articles with underscores in the title